Logan Campbell may refer to:
 Sir John Logan Campbell (1817–1912), New Zealand public figure
 Logan Campbell (rugby league) (born 1971), New Zealand rugby league footballer
 Logan Campbell (taekwondo) (born 1986), New Zealand taekwondo practitioner
 Logan Campbell (sailor) (born 1987), Canadian Paralympic sailor

See also
 Campbell Logan (1910–1978), British television producer